Duborg-Skolen is a Danish non-denominational secondary school with Sixth Form extension located in Flensburg, Germany. It is one of a number of schools operated by members of the Danish minority of Southern Schleswig, and it is the leading school for this community.

The school teaches both Danish and German at native-speaker level. All other topics are instructed in Danish.

Duborg-Skolen was established in 1924 as a Danish realskole and in 1958 it was recognized as a non-denominational school with Sixth Form extension. The curriculum enables its students to continue education in both Germany and Denmark.

Its buildings are located in the Flensburg district of Duburg (Danish: Duborg), hence the name, and operated by the Dansk Skoleforening for Sydslesvig (Danish School Association for Southern Schleswig).

External links 
  Official website

This page is based on the corresponding pages from the Danish and German Wikipedias accessed on 2 May 2006.

Danish schools in Southern Schleswig
Educational institutions established in 1924
Buildings and structures in Schleswig-Holstein
Buildings and structures in Flensburg
1924 establishments in Germany